Pseudopostega resimafurcata is a moth of the family Opostegidae. It was described by Donald R. Davis and Jonas R. Stonis, 2007. It is known from south-eastern Brazil.

The length of the forewings is about 4.1 mm. Adults have been recorded in October.

Etymology
The species name is derived from the Latin resimus (meaning turned up, bent back) and furcatus (meaning forked) in reference to the dorsally curved, furcate apex of the male gnathos.

References

Opostegidae
Moths described in 2007